John Cannis  (born November 4, 1951) is a Canadian politician. He was a former member of the House of Commons of Canada.

Background
Born in Kalymnos, Greece, Cannis was raised and educated in Toronto, Ontario. A successful entrepreneur for 18 years, Cannis owned a Toronto-based international executive search firm and was a member in good standing of Association of Professional Placement Agencies and Consultants. He also served as a computer and human resource consultant.

Cannis and his wife of more than 40 years, Mary, have three children; Irene (Tony), Paul (Christina), Daniel and four grandchildren.

Politics
Cannis ran as the Liberal candidate in the 1993 election in the riding of Scarborough Centre and was elected as a Member of Parliament. He continued to serve for 18 years before his defeat by Conservative Roxanne James in 2011.

From 1999 to 2001, Cannis served as the Parliamentary Secretary to the Minister of Industry. As Parliamentary Secretary, he successfully guided four pieces of legislation through the House of Commons and committee stages; specifically, the Privacy Act, the Space Agency Act, the Canadian Tourism Commission Act and the Patent Act.

Notable committee appointments included Vice-Chair of the Standing Committee on National Defence,  Chair of the Standing Committee on National Defence and Veterans Affairs, Chair of the Subcommittee on International Trade, Trade Disputes and Investment (SINT) of the Standing Committee on Foreign Affairs and International Trade (FAAE) and as Vice-Chair on the Standing Committee on Transport.

In 2004, when the Khadr family returned to Canada, they were met by a loud wave of public sentiment in favour of revoking their citizenship and deporting them.  Cannis, as the Member of Parliament for their region, called for the entire family to be charged under the Canadian Anti-Terrorism Act for "aiding a terrorist organization with which Canada is at war". Prime Minister Paul Martin responded by saying that the Khadrs "have a right to their own opinions".

Cannis ran as an independent candidate in Scarborough Centre in the 2019 Canadian federal election and received 5.42% of the vote.

Electoral record

				

Note: Conservative vote is compared to the total of the Canadian Alliance vote and Progressive Conservative vote in 2000 election.

Note: Canadian Alliance vote is compared to the Reform vote in 1997 election.

References

External links
 Official site
 How'd They Vote?: John Cannis' voting history and quotes
 

1951 births
Canadian people of Greek descent
Greek emigrants to Canada
Living people
Members of the House of Commons of Canada from Ontario
Naturalized citizens of Canada
People from Kalymnos
People from Scarborough, Toronto
Politicians from Toronto
Recipients of the Order of the Phoenix (Greece)
21st-century Canadian politicians